Frampton Comes Alive! II (styled as Frampton Comes Alive II on the packaging) is Peter Frampton's second live album published in 1995. It is a sequel to his 1976 multiplatinum album Frampton Comes Alive.

The album contains live versions of many of the songs from his 1980s and 1990s solo albums, consciously avoiding his 1970s hits. It was accompanied by a video release on VHS, recorded at The Fillmore in San Francisco on 15 June 1995.

Frampton Comes Alive II was released 10 October 1995 on IRS Records. However, contrary to Jerry Pompili's introductory comments on the album, lightning didn't strike twice and the album sold poorly. The album reached No. 121 on the UK Albums Chart and failed to chart in the US.

All songs for the 1995 release were recorded at The Fillmore on 15 June 1995 except Off the Hook, which was recorded the following evening on 16 June, and More Ways Than One, recorded in August 1992 at the Ventura Theatre in Ventura, California. A special edition of the album was released on 30 January 2007 with four extra songs containing  four hits from the 1970s. A DVD edition was released at the same time.

Track listing
 "Introduction by Jerry Pompili"	
 "Day in the Sun" - (Peter Frampton, Kevin Savigar)
 "Lying"	- (Frampton)
 "For Now" - (Frampton, Pat MacDonald, Steve Seskin)	
 "Most of All"	(Frampton, John Regan)
 "You" -	(Frampton, Kevin Savigar)
 "Waiting For Your Love" - (Frampton, Kevin Savigar)	
 "I'm in You" - (Frampton)	
 "Talk To Me" - (Frampton)	
 "Hang On To a Dream" - (Tim Hardin) 
 "Can't Take That Away" (Frampton, Jonathan Cain)	
 "More Ways Than One" - (Frampton, Danny Wilde)	
 "Almost Said Goodbye" - (Frampton, Mark Hudson, Dennis Greaves) 	
 "Off The Hook" - (Frampton, Kevin Savigar)
	

2007 Special Edition Disc 2
 "Show Me The Way" - (Frampton)
 "Nassau/Baby, I Love Your Way"	- (Frampton)
 "Lines on My Face" - (Frampton)	
 "Do You Feel Like We Do" - (Frampton, Mick Gallagher, Rick Wills, John Siomos)

Personnel 
Peter Frampton – guitar, talkbox, vocals
Bob Mayo – keyboard, guitar, backing vocals
John Regan – bass guitar, backing vocals
J. R. Robinson – drums, percussion

See also
Frampton Comes Alive!
Peter Frampton discography

References

Peter Frampton albums
1995 live albums
Albums produced by Peter Frampton
I.R.S. Records live albums
Sequel albums